758 Naval Air Squadron (758 NAS) was a Naval Air Squadron of the Royal Navy's Fleet Air Arm. It was initially formed as a Telegraphist Air Gunner Training Squadron from 1941 to 1942, operating out of RNAS Eastleigh (HMS Raven). The squadron reformed at RNAS Donibristle (HMS Merlin), in 1942, as a Beam Approach School. Moving to RNAS Hinstock (HMS Godwit), it was known as the Naval Advanced Instrument Flying School, disbanding in 1946, at RNAS Peplow (HMS Godwit II).

History of 758 NAS

Telegraphist Air Gunner Training Squadron (1939 - 1941) 

758 Naval Air Squadron formed at RNAS Eastleigh (HMS Raven), in Hampshire, on 1 July 1939, as a Telegraphist Air Gunner Training Squadron, re-numbered from 759 Naval Air Squadron and as part of No.2 Air Gunners School. It operated with Shark II, Osprey III and Proctor Ia and IIa aircraft.

The squadron continued Telegraphist Air Gunner training from Eastleigh, throughout the following fifteen months, before moving to RNAS Arbroath (HMS Condor), East Angus, Scotland, on the 14 October 1940. Here, the squadron was equipped with Proctor, Roc and Skua aircraft, continuing TAG training for a further four months, eventually disbanding on the 1 February 1941.

Naval Advanced Instrument Flying Training Unit (1942 - 1946) 

758 Naval Air Squadron reformed at RNAS Donibristle (HMS Merlin), near Dunfermline, in Fife, on 25 May 1942. Operating Oxford aircraft, the squadron remained at Donibristle for around three months, moving to RNAS Hinstock (HMS Godwit), in Shropshire, on the 15 August 1942.

It was initially known as the Beam Approach School, then later known as the Blind Approach School. In 1943 it was titled Naval Advanced Instrument Flying School and as well as Oxford aircraft, the squadron also operated Anson, Reliant, Tiger Moth, and Wellington aircraft. Later in the year Harvard aircraft replaced the Wellingtons and by 1944, 758 NAS had over 100 aircraft.

The relief landing grounds, at RNAS Weston Park (HMS Godwit II), situated in the grounds of Weston Park, a country house in Weston-under-Lizard, Staffordshire, and RNAS Bratton, located at Bratton, Shropshire, were used by 758 NAS for Instrument Flying Training, until Hinstock gained Peplow as a satellite airfield, from 28 February 1945 and the squadron then operated from RNAS Peplow (HMS Godwit II), situated just outside Peplow in Shropshire.

On the 18 March 1946 the squadron absorbed part of 798 Naval Air Squadron, however, 758 NAS disbanded on the 14 May 1946, at Peplow, becoming 'B' Flight of 780 Naval Air Squadron.

Aircraft flown 

The squadron has flown a number of different aircraft types, including:
Hawker Osprey
Blackburn Shark
Percival Proctor
Blackburn Roc
Blackburn Skua
Airspeed Oxford
Avro Anson
Stinson Reliant
de Havilland Tiger Moth
Vickers Wellington XI
North American Harvard

Fleet Air Arm Bases 
758 NAS operated from a number of air bases:
Royal Naval Air Station EASTLEIGH (1 July 1939 - 14 October 1940)
Royal Naval Air Station ARBROATH (14 October 1940 - 1 February 1941)
Royal Naval Air Station DONIBRISTLE (25 May 1942 - 15 August 1942)
Royal Naval Air Station HINSTOCK (15 August 1942 - 28 February 1945)
Royal Naval Air Station PEPLOW (28 February 1945 - 14 May 1946)

References

Citations

Bibliography

700 series Fleet Air Arm squadrons
Military units and formations established in 1939
Military units and formations of the Royal Navy in World War II